Christian population growth is the population growth of the global Christian community. According to a 2011 Pew Research Center survey, there were more than 2.2 billion Christians around the world in 2010, more than three times as many as the 600 million recorded in 1910. However, this rate of growth is slower than the overall population growth over the same time period. In 2020, Pew estimated the number of Christians worldwide to be around 2.38 billion. According to various scholars and sources, high birth rates and conversions in the Global South were cited as the reasons for the Christian population growth.

Summary

The Christian fertility rate is 2.7 children per woman, which is higher than the global average fertility rate of 2.5. Globally, Christians were only slightly older (median age of 30) than the global average median age of 28 in 2010. According to Pew Research religious switching is projected to have a modest impact on changes in the Christian population. According to various scholars and sources, Pentecostalism is the fastest-growing religious movement in the world; this growth is primarily due to religious conversion to Pentecostal and Charismatic Christianity.

According to the World Christian Encyclopedia, approximately 2.7 million converting to Christianity from another religion, World Christian Encyclopedia also cited that Christianity rank at first place in net gains through religious conversion. While according to "The Oxford Handbook of Religious Conversion", approximately 15.5 million converting to Christianity from another religion, while approximately 11.7 million leave Christianity, and most of them become irreligious, resulting in a net gain of 3.8 million. Christianity earns about 65.1 million people due to factors such as birth rate and religious conversion while losing 27.4 million people due to factors such as death rate and religious apostasy. Most of the net growth in the numbers of Christians are in Africa, Latin America and Asia.

Fertility rate
The Christian fertility rate has varied throughout history, as with other fertility figures. The Christian fertility rate also varies from country to country. In the 20-year period from 1989 to 2009, the average world fertility rate decreased from 3.50 to 2.58, a fall of 0.92 children per woman, or 26%. The weighted average fertility rate for Christian nations decreased in the same period from 3.26 to 2.58, a fall of 0.68 children per woman, or 21%. The weighted average fertility rate for Muslim nations decreased in the same period from 5.17 to 3.23, a fall of 1.94 children per woman, or 38%. While Muslims have an average of 3.1 children per woman—the highest rate of all religious groups—Christians are second, with 2.7 children per woman.

The gap in fertility between the Christian- and Muslim-dominated nations fell from 67% in 1990 to 17% in 2010. According to a study published by the Pew Research Center in 2017, births to Muslims between the years of 2010 and 2015 made up an estimated 31% of all babies born around the world. By the Pew Research Center's estimates, the Muslim fertility rate and Christian fertility rate will converge by 2040.

Conversion

According to the World Christian Encyclopedia, approximately 2.7 million convert to Christianity annually from another religion; World Christian Encyclopedia also stated that Christianity ranks in first place in net gains through religious conversion. While, according to book "The Oxford Handbook of Religious Conversion", which published by the professor of Christian mission Charles E. Farhadian, and the professor of psychology Lewis Ray Rambo, between 1990 and 2000, approximately 1.9 million people converted to Christianity from another religion, with Christianity ranking first in net gains through religious conversion. 
According to "The Oxford Handbook of Religious Conversion", in mid-2005 approximately 15.5 million converted to Christianity from another religion, approximately 11.7 million left Christianity, and most of them became irreligious, resulting in a net gain of 3.8 million. Christianity added about 65.1 million people due to factors such as birth rate and religious conversion, while it lost 27.4 million people due to factors such as death rate and religious apostasy in mid-2005. Most of the net growth in the numbers of Christians is in Africa, Latin America and Asia.
Christianity is expected to lose a net of 66 million adherents (40 million converts versus 106 million apostate) mostly to religiously unaffiliated category between 2010 and 2050, it is also expected that Christianity may have the largest net loses in terms of religious conversion. However, these forecasts lack reliable data on religious conversion in China, but according to media reports and expert assessments, it is possible that the rapid growth of Christianity in China may maintain, or even increase, the current numerical advantage of Christianity as the largest religion in the world. This scenario (Chinese scenario) is based primarily on sensitivity tests.
According to scholar Philip Jenkins Christianity is growing rapidly in China and some other Asian countries and sub-Saharan Africa. 
According to various scholars and sources, Pentecostalism is the fastest-growing religious movement in the world; this growth is primarily due to religious conversion to Pentecostal and Charismatic Christianity. According to Pulitzer Center 35,000 people become Pentecostal or "Born again" every day. According to scholar Keith Smith of Georgia State University "many scholars claim that Pentecostalism is the fastest growing religious phenomenon in human history", and according to scholar Peter L. Berger of Boston University "the spread of Pentecostal Christianity may be the fastest growing movement in the history of religion".
According to a report by the Singapore Management University, more people in Southeast Asia are converting to Christianity, and these new converts are mostly Chinese business managers. According to scholar Juliette Koning and Heidi Dahles of Vrije Universiteit Amsterdam there is a "rapid expansion of charismatic Christianity from the 1980s onwards. Singapore, China, Hong Kong, Taiwan, Indonesia, and Malaysia are said to have the fastest-growing Christian communities and the majority of the new believers are “upwardly mobile, urban, middle-class Chinese”. Asia has the second largest Pentecostal-charismatic Christians of any continent, with the number growing from 10 million to 135 million between 1970 and 2000". According to scholar Wang Zuoa, 500,000 Chinese converts to Protestantism annually. According to scholar Todd Hartch of Eastern Kentucky University, by 2005, around 6 million Africans converted to Christianity annually. 
Conversion into Christianity has significantly increased among Korean, Chinese, and Japanese in the United States. In 2012, the percentage of Christians in these communities were 71%, 30% and 37% respectively. 
Due to conversion, the number of Chinese Christians increased significantly from 4 million before 1949 to 67 million in 2010.
It's been reported also that increasing numbers of young people or educated people are becoming Christians in several countries such as China, Hong Kong, Indonesia, Iran, Japan, Singapore, and South Korea. 
The 2015 Believers in Christ from a Muslim Background: A Global Census study published by Baylor University institute for studies of religion estimates that 10.2 million Muslims converted to Christianity based on global missionary data. Countries with the largest numbers of Muslims converted to Christianity according to this study include Indonesia (6,500,000), Nigeria (600,000), Iran (500,000 versus only 500 in 1979), the United States (450,000), Ethiopia (400,000) and Algeria (380,000). Indonesia is home to the largest Christian community made up of converts from their former Islamic faith; according to various sources, since the mid and late 1960s, between two million to 2.5 million Muslims converted to Christianity.
According to the Council on Foreign Relations in 2007, experts estimated that thousands of Muslims in the Western world converted to Christianity annually, but were not publicized due to fear of retribution.

By branches

Catholic Church

Church membership in 2019 was 1.34 billion people (18% of the global population at the time), increasing from the 1950 figure of 437 million and 654 million in 1970. On 31 December 2008, membership was 1.166 billion, an increase of 11.54% over the same date in 2000, and slightly greater than the rate of increase of the world population (10.77%). The increase was 33.02% in Africa, but only 1.17% in Europe. It was 15.91% in Asia, 11.39% in Oceania, and 10.93% in Americas. As a result, Catholics were 17.77% of the total population in Africa, 63.10% in Americas, 3.05% in Asia, 39.97% in Europe, 26.21% in Oceania, and 17.40% of the world population. Of the world's Catholics, the proportion living in Africa grew from 12.44% in 2000 to 14.84% in 2008, while those living in Europe fell from 26.81% to 24.31%. However, Catholic numbers have grown in Scandinavia where the Catholics in Nordic dioceses have tripled or even quadrupled. For example, in Denmark, Norway, Sweden and Finland, 330,000 Catholics have now registered in their dioceses. Membership of the Catholic Church is attained through baptism, and from 1983 to 2009, if someone formally left the Church, that fact was noted in the register of the person's baptism.
Monsignor Vittorio Formenti, who compiles the Vatican's yearbook, said in an interview with the Vatican newspaper L'Osservatore Romano that "For the first time in history, we are no longer at the top: Muslims have overtaken us." He said that Catholics accounted for 17.4 percent of the world population—a stable percentage—while Muslims were at 19.2 percent. "It is true that while Muslim families, as is well known, continue to make a lot of children, Christian ones on the contrary tend to have fewer and fewer", the monsignor said, though Africa and parts of Asia are the exception. If the UN report in 2018 is on target, Africa's population will grow to 4.5 billion by 2100, adding to all African religious groups. Muslims in 2010 represented as much as 23.4% of the total world population and this is expected to increase to 26.3% by 2030. The global Catholic population is projected to grow to 1.63 billion in 2050, but by that time Islam will have nearly 3 billion adherents.

Eastern Orthodoxy

Protestantism

According to Mark Jürgensmeyer of the University of California, popular Protestantism is one of the most dynamic religious movements in the contemporary world. Changes in worldwide Protestantism over the last century have been significant. Since 1900, due primarily to conversion, Protestantism has spread rapidly in Africa, Asia, Oceania and Latin America.
There are more than 900 million Protestants worldwide, among approximately 2.4 billion Christians. In 2010, a total of more than 800 million included 300 million in Sub-Saharan Africa, 260 million in the Americas, 140 million in Asia-Pacific region, 100 million in Europe and 2 million in Middle East-North Africa. Protestants account for nearly forty percent of Christians worldwide and more than one tenth of the total human population.
Protestantism is growing in Africa, Eastern Europe, Asia, Latin America, Muslim world, and Oceania, while remaining stable or declining in Anglo America and Europe, with some exceptions such as France, where it was eradicated after the abolition of the Edict of Nantes by the Edict of Fontainebleau and the following persecution of Huguenots, but now is claimed to be stable in number or even growing slightly. According to some, Russia is another country to see a Protestant revival.
According to various scholars and sources, Pentecostalism is the fastest-growing religious movement in the world; this growth is primarily due to religious conversion to Pentecostal and Charismatic Christianity. According to Pulitzer Center 35,000 people become Pentecostal or "Born again" every day. According to scholar Keith Smith of Georgia State University "many scholars claim that Pentecostalism is the fastest growing religious phenomenon in human history", and according to scholar Peter L. Berger of Boston University "the spread of Pentecostal Christianity may be the fastest growing movement in the history of religion".

By continent

According to the Carnegie Endowment for International Peace, the World Christian Database as of 2007 estimated the six fastest-growing religions of the world to be Islam (1.84%), the Baháʼí Faith (1.7%), Sikhism (1.62%), Jainism (1.57%), Hinduism (1.52%) and Christianity (1.32%). High birth rates and conversions in the global South were cited as the reasons for the Christian population growths.
The U.S. Center for World Mission stated a growth rate of Christianity at 2.3% for the period 1970 to 1996 (slightly higher than the world population growth rate at the time). This increased the claimed percentage of adherents of Christianity from 33.7% to 33.9%.
The World Christian Database as of 2007 estimated the growth rate of Christianity at 1.32%. High birth rates and conversions were cited as the main reasons.
Using data from the period 2000–2005 the 2006 Christian World Database estimated that by number of new adherents, Christianity was the fastest growing religion in the world with 30,360,000 new adherents in 2006. This was followed by Islam with 23,920,000 and Hinduism with 13,224,000 estimated new adherents in the same period.
According to 2011 Pew Research Center survey, there are more than 2.2 billion Christians around the world in 2010, up from about 600 million in 1910.
The 2015 "Believers in Christ from a Muslim Background: A Global Census" estimates 10,283,700 Muslim converted to Christianity around the world.
On 2 April 2015, the Pew Research Center published a Demographic Study about "The Future of World Religions: Population Growth Projections, 2010-2050" with projections regarding Christianity. The projection begins with 2010 statistics when "Christianity was by far the world's largest religion, with an estimated 2.2 billion adherents, nearly a third (31%) of all 6.9 billion people on Earth. Islam was second, with 1.6 billion adherents, or 23% of the global population."

Projected growth of Christianity by 2050
Some of the projections are as follows:
Over the 2010-2050 period, Christians will remain the largest religious group with 30.7% of the world's population. However, Islam will grow faster and become 29.7% of the world's population. Therefore, by 2050 there will be 2.8 billion Muslims compared to 2.9 billion Christians.
"In the United States, Christians will decline from more than three-quarters of the population in 2010 to two-thirds in 2050".
"Four out of every 10 Christians in the world will live in sub-Saharan Africa".

Reasons given for the projected growth
Some of the reasons the Study gives are as follows:
The change in the world's religious is "driven primarily by differences in fertility rates and the size of youth populations among the world's major religions, as well as by people switching faiths".
Fertility rates. "Religions with many adherents in developing countries, where birth rates are high, and infant mortality rates generally have been falling, are likely to grow quickly." Therefore, much of the growth of Christianity is projected to take place in sub-Saharan Africa. Globally, Christians have a birth rate of 2.7 children per woman. But Muslims have a higher rate, namely, an average of 3.1 children per woman. This differential is one of the reasons that the Muslim population is growing faster than the Christian.
Size of youth population. "In 2010, more than a quarter of the world's total population (27%) was under the age of 15." Christian youth under 15 were the same as the 27% global average. But an even higher percentage of Muslims (34%) were younger than 15. This higher youth population is one of the reasons that from 2010-2050 Muslims are projected to grow faster than Christians.
Size of old population. In 2010, "11% of the world's population was at least 60 years old", 14% of the Christian population was over 60 years old, but only 7% of Muslims were over 60. This is another reason that Muslims are projected to grow faster than Christians.
Switching. A loss of 66 million Christians is projected to come through switching. Most of the loss is projected to come from Christians "joining the ranks of the religiously unaffiliated".

The whole Pew Research Center can be read by clicking The Future of World Religions.

Africa

Christianity has been estimated to be growing rapidly in South America, Africa, and Asia. In Africa, for instance, in 1900, there were only 8.7 million adherents of Christianity; now there are 390 million, and it is expected that by 2025 there will be 600 million Christians in Africa. The number of Catholics in Africa has increased from one million in 1902 to 329,882,000. From 2015 to 2016 alone, Africa saw an increase of 49,767,000 Catholics, a larger increase than any other continent. There are now 1.5 million churches whose congregations account for 46 million people.
According to scholar Todd Hartch of Eastern Kentucky University, by 2005, around 6 million Africans converted to Christianity annually.
According to scholar R.V. Dmitriev, over 3.3 million African converted to Christianity in 2010.
A 2015 study estimates 2,161,000 Muslim Africans that convert to Christianity.

Algeria

Since 1960 a growing number of Algerian Muslims are converting to Christianity. 
Converts to Christianity may be investigated and searched by the authorities. Conversions to Christianity have been most common in Kabylie, especially in the wilaya of Tizi-Ouzou.
A 2015 study estimates 380,000 Muslims converted to Christianity in Algeria.

Benin
A 2015 study estimates 40,000 Muslims converted to Christianity in Benin.

Burkina Faso
A 2015 study estimates 200,000 Muslims converted to Christianity in Burkina Faso.

Burundi
A 2015 study estimates 2,200 Muslims converted to Christianity in Burundi.

Cameroon
A 2015 study estimates 90,000 Muslims converted to Christianity in Cameroon.

Central African Republic
A 2015 study estimates 1,500 Muslims converted to Christianity in Central African Republic.

Egypt

A 2015 study estimates some 14,000 Muslims who converted to Christianity in Egypt.

Ethiopia

A 2015 study estimates 400,000 Muslims converted to Christianity in Ethiopia most belonging to the Ethiopian Orthodox Church.

Libya

A 2015 study estimated some 1,500 believers in Christ from a Muslim background living in the country.

Morocco

Since 1960 a growing number of Moroccan Muslims are converting to Christianity.
On 27 March 2010, the Moroccan magazine TelQuel stated that thousands of Moroccans had converted to Christianity. Pointing out the absence of official data, Service de presse Common Ground cites unspecified sources that stated that about 5,000 Moroccans became Christians between 2005 and 2010. According to the International Religious Freedom Report for 2014 estimate that there may be as many as 8,000 Christian citizens throughout the country, but many reportedly do not meet regularly due to fear of government surveillance and social persecution.
According to different estimates, there are about 25,000-45,000 Moroccan Christians of Berber or Arab descent mostly converted from Islam. Other sources give a number of a bit more than 1,000. A popular Christian program by Brother Rachid has led many former Muslims in North Africa and the Middle East to convert to Christianity. His programs have been credited with assisting in the conversion of over 150,000 former Muslims to Christianity in Morocco.

Nigeria

The percentage of Christians in Nigeria grew from 21.4% in 1953 to 48.2% in 2011. This is due to the high number of missionaries in Nigeria.
ِA 2015 study estimates some 600,000 believers in Christ are from a Muslim background living in Nigeria.

South Africa

In South Africa, Pentecostalism has grown from 0.2% in 1951 to 7.6% in 2001.

Tunisia

International Religious Freedom Report for 2007 estimate thousands of Tunisian Muslims who convert to Christianity.

Americas

Argentina

A 2015 study estimates some 2,200 Christian believers from a Muslim background in the country, most of them belonging to some form of Protestantism.
Data from 2013, show that 64,000 Argentine Jews identify themselves as Christians.

Canada

According to 1991/2001/2011-Census, the number of Christians in Canada has decreased from 22.5 million to 22.1 million.
A 2015 study estimates some 43,000 believers in Christ from a Muslim background in Canada, most of whom belong to the evangelical tradition.

Mexico

According to INEGI, The number of Catholics grows annually by 1.7%.

United States

The United States government does not collect religious data in its census. The survey below, the American Religious Identification Survey (ARIS) 2008, was a random digit-dialed telephone survey of 54,461 American residential households in the contiguous United States. The 1990 sample size was 113,723; 2001 sample size was 50,281.

Adult respondents were asked the open-ended question, "What is your religion, if any?" Interviewers did not prompt or offer a suggested list of potential answers. The religion of the spouse or partner was also asked. If the initial answer was "Protestant" or "Christian" further questions were asked to probe which particular denomination. About one-third of the sample was asked more detailed demographic questions.

Among the Asian population in the United States, conversion into Christianity is significantly increasing among Korean, Chinese, and Japanese. By 2012 the percentage of Christians in these communities was 71%, 31%, and 38% respectively.

Data from the Pew Research Center states that, as of 2013, about 1.6 million adult American Jews identify themselves as Christians, most as Protestants. According to the same data, most of the Jews who identify themselves as some sort of Christian (1.6 million) were raised as Jewish or are Jews by ancestry. According to a 2014 study by the Pew Research Center, 19% of those who say they were raised Jewish in the United States, consider themselves Christian.

According to Pew Research, Christianity loses more people than it gains from religious conversion. It found that 23% of Americans raised as Christians no longer identified with Christianity, whereas 6% of current Christians converted. This was in contrast to Islam in America, where the number of people who leave the religion is roughly equal to the number who convert to it. The National Catholic Register claims that in 2015 there were 450,000 American Muslim converts to Christianity and that 20,000 Muslims convert to Christianity annually in the United States. According to scholar Rob Scott of University of Tasmania in 2010 there were "approximately 180,000 Arab Americans and about 130,000 Iranian Americans who converted from Islam to Christianity". 

Religious Self-Identification of the U.S. Adult Population: 1990, 2001, 2008Figures are not adjusted for refusals to reply; investigators suspect refusals are possibly more representative of "no religion" than any other group.

Highlights:
The ARIS 2008 survey was carried out from February–November 2008 and collected answers from 54,461 respondents who were questioned in English or Spanish.
The American population self-identifies as predominantly Christian but Americans are slowly becoming less Christian.
86% of American adults identified as Christians in 1990 and 76% in 2008.
The historic Mainline churches and denominations have experienced the steepest declines while the non-denominational Christian identity has been trending upward particularly since 2001.
The challenge to Christianity in the United States does not come from other religions but rather from a rejection of all forms of organized religion.
34% of American adults considered themselves "Born Again or Evangelical Christians" in 2008.
The U.S. population continues to show signs of becoming less religious, with one out of every seven Americans failing to indicate a religious identity in 2008.
The "Nones" (no stated religious preference, atheist, or agnostic) continue to grow, though at a much slower pace than in the 1990s, from 8.2% in 1990 to 14.1% in 2001, to 15.0% in 2008.
Asian Americans are substantially more likely to indicate no religious identity than other racial or ethnic groups.
One sign of the lack of attachment of Americans to religion is that 27% do not expect a religious funeral at their death.
Based on their stated beliefs rather than their religious identification in 2008, 70% of Americans believe in a personal God, roughly 12% of Americans are atheist (no God) or agnostic (unknowable or unsure), and another 12% are deistic (a higher power but no personal God).
America's religious geography has been transformed since 1990. Religious switching along with Hispanic immigration has significantly changed the religious profile of some states and regions. Between 1990 and 2008, the Catholic population proportion of the New England states fell from 50% to 36% and in New York it fell from 44% to 37%, while it rose in California from 29% to 37% and in Texas from 23% to 32%.
Overall the 1990–2008 ARIS time series shows that changes in religious self-identification in the first decade of the 21st century have been moderate in comparison to the 1990s, which was a period of significant shifts in the religious composition of the United States

Asia

According to scholar Philip Jenkins Christianity is growing rapidly in China and some other Asian countries. 
According to a report by the Singapore Management University, more people in Southeast Asia are converting to Christianity, and these new converts are mostly Chinese business managers.
According to scholar Juliette Koning and Heidi Dahles of Vrije Universiteit Amsterdam there is a "rapid expansion of charismatic Christianity from the 1980s onwards. Singapore, China, Hong Kong, Taiwan, Indonesia, and Malaysia are said to have the fastest-growing Christian communities and the majority of the new believers are “upwardly mobile, urban, middle-class Chinese”. Asia has the second largest Pentecostal-charismatic Christians of any continent, with the number growing from 10 million to 135 million between 1970 and 2000".

Afghanistan

The United States Department of State estimated the numbers of the Muslim Afghan who convert to Christianity between 500 and 8,000.

Azerbaijan

According to reports there is about 5,000 ethnic Azerbaijani Protestant community most of them came from Muslim backgrounds.

Bangladesh

 According to scholars Khalil Bilici, during the Bangladesh Liberation War (March–December 1971), a significant number of Bangladeshis left Islam to join Christianity (because missionaries stood with them during their difficult times during the civil strife) or to atheism after 1971 due to their experience of oppression conducted by fellow Muslims from West Pakistan.
A 2015 study estimates some 130,000 Christians from a Muslim background residing in the Bangladesh, though not all are necessarily citizens.
The United Nations High Commissioner for Refugees estimated the numbers of the Muslim who convert to Christianity in Bangladesh has risen from two hundred thousand to four hundred thousand between 1971 and 1991.
The Home Office estimated that 91,000 Muslims have converted to Christianity in Bangladesh.

China

In recent years, the number of Chinese Christians has increased significantly, particularly since the easing of restrictions on religious activity during economic reforms in the late 1970s; Christians were 4 million before 1949 (including Catholics and Protestants), and reaching 67 million (unofficial figure) in 2010. Various statistical analyses have found that between 2% and 4% of the Chinese identify as Christian.
The government declared in 2018 that there are over 44 million Christians (Protestant: 38M, Catholic: 6M) in China.
According to a study by a scholar Fenggang Yang from Purdue University, Christianity is "spreading among the Chinese of South-East Asia", and "Evangelical and Pentecostal Christianity is growing more quickly in China", also according to him, more than half of them have university degrees. 
According to the Council on Foreign Relations the "number of Chinese Protestants has grown by an average of 10 percent annually since 1979".

India

Christianity is the third largest religion in India after Hinduism and Islam, with approximately 30 million followers.
A 2015 study estimates some 40,000 Christian believers from a Muslim background in the country, most of them belonging to some form of Protestantism or Catholicism.
While the exact number of Dalit converts to Christianity in India is not available, scholar William R. Burrow of Colorado State University estimated that about 8% of Dalit have converted to Christianity. 
According to a 2021 study by the Pew Research Center, Christianity in India gained an increase from conversion, most of the Christian converts in India are former Hindus.

Indonesia

According to various sources, between 1965 and 1985 about 2.5 million Indonesian converted from Islam to Christianity.
The "Believers in Christ from a Muslim Background: A Global Census" found that between 1960 and 2015 about 6.5 million Indonesian Muslims convert to Christianity. 
Some reports also show that many of the Chinese Indonesians minority convert to Christianity. Demographer Aris Ananta reported in 2008 that "anecdotal evidence suggests that more Buddhist Chinese have become Christians as they increased their standards of education".

Iran

Significant numbers of Muslims convert to Christianity in Iran, estimates range from 300,000 to 500,000 by various sources. Other estimates put the numbers between 800,000 to 3 million.
According to scholar Ladan Boroumand "Iran today is witnessing the highest rate of Christianization in the world", and according to scholar Shay Khatiri of Johns Hopkins University “Islam is the fastest shrinking religion in there [Iran], while Christianity is growing the fastest”, and in 2018 "up to half a million Iranians are Christian converts from Muslim families, and most of these Christians are evangelicals", and he adds "recent estimates claim that the number might have climbed up to somewhere between 1 million and 3 million".
Christianity is reportedly the fastest growing religion in Iran with an average annual rate of 5.2%. A 2015 study estimates between 100,000 and 500,000 believers Christians from a Muslim background living in Iran, most of them evangelical Christians.
Converting to Christianity is growing among Muslims in the Iranian diaspora.

Israel

Several thousand Israelis practice Messianic Jewish denominations, which are often considered as Christian sects. The Messianic Jews usually combine Jewish and Christian practices but do recognize Jesus as the Messiah. There are no exact numbers on those communities, but it is believed that several hundred to several thousand ethnic Jews belong to this tradition as well as several thousand Israelis of mixed ancestry (mostly mixed Jewish and Slavic).
The Christian population in Israel has increased significantly with the immigration of many mixed families from the former Soviet Union (1989-late 1990s).
A 2015 study estimates some 300 Christians from a Muslim background in Israel.

Japan

Christianity is one of several minority religions in Japan, accounting for about not more than 1 percent of the population.
According to a poll conducted by the Gallup Organization in 2006, Christianity has increased significantly in Japan, particularly among youth, and a high number of teens are becoming Christians.
A 2015 study estimates some 300 Christians from a Muslim background in Japan.

Jordan

A 2015 study estimates some 6,500 Christian believers from a Muslim background in the country, most of them belonging to some form of Eastern Orthodoxy.

Kazakhstan

In spite of the persecution of converts from Islam to Christianity, a 2015 study estimates some 50,000 believers in Christ from a Muslim background residing in the country.

Kuwait

There are a number of believers in Christ from a Muslim background in the country, though many are not citizens. A 2015 study estimates that around 350 people in the country follow these beliefs.

Kyrgyzstan

A 2015 study estimates some 19,000 Christians from a Muslim background residing in the country, though not all are necessarily citizens of Kyrgyzstan.
Exact numbers of Muslim Kyrgyz converts to Christianity vary but an estimate of around 20,000 is generally accepted among scholars

Malaysia

There is no well researched agreement on the actual number of Malaysian Muslim converts to Christianity in Malaysia. But according to Tan Sri Dr Harussani Zakaria, they are 260,000.

Mongolia

Oman

A 2015 study estimates a mere 200 believers in Christ from a Muslim background in the country, and not all of those are necessarily citizens.

Saudi Arabia

A 2015 study estimates 60,000 Muslims converted to Christianity in Saudi Arabia.

Singapore

The percentage of Christians among Singaporeans increased from 12.7% in 1990 to 17.5% in 2010.
According to scholar Michael Nai-Chiu Poon of University of Toronto conversion to Christianity is increasing among Chinese Singaporeans.
It's been reported also that increasing numbers of young people or educated people are becoming Christians in Singapore.

South Korea

In South Korea, Christianity has grown from 20.7% in 1985 to 29.5% in 2005 according to the World Christian Database.

Syria

A 2015 study estimates some 2,000 Muslims who converted to Christianity in Syria, most of them belonging to some form of Protestantism or Oriental Orthodoxy.
Converting to Christianity is growing among Muslims in the Syrian diaspora, and among Kurds in Syria. 
By one estimate made by Elisabet Granli from University of Oslo, around 1,920 Syrian Druz converted to Christianity.

Tajikistan

In spite of opposition in relation to conversion from Islam to Christianity, a 2015 study estimates some 2,600 to 3,000 Christians with Muslim backgrounds reside in the country.

Turkey

According to the newspaper, "Milliyet" reports 35,000 Muslim Turks convert into Christianity in 2008.
A 2015 study estimates some 4,500 believers in Christ from a Muslim background in Turkey, most of them Turks. The ethnic Turkish Protestant Christian community in Turkey number about 4,000-5,000 adherents most of them came from Muslim Turkish background.

Uzbekistan

A 2015 study estimates some 10,000 believers in Christ from a Muslim background in the country, most of them belonging to some sort of evangelical or charismatic Protestant community.

Vietnam

The US Department of State estimates that Protestant Christianity may have grown 600% over the last decade in Vietnam.

Europe

Albania

Since 1960 a growing number of Albanian Muslims are converting to Christianity. 
A 2015 study estimated some 13,000 followers of Christ from a Muslim background, though it is not clear to which Christian churches these people had converted.
Converting to Christianity is growing among Muslims in the Albanian diaspora.

Belgium

Reports estimated that "many" Muslims convert every year to Christianity in Belgium.

Bulgaria

Reports estimated that thousands of Muslims (mostly Bulgarian Turks) convert every year to Christianity in Bulgaria. A 2015 study estimates 45,000 Christian believers from a Muslim background in the country, most of them belonging to some form of Protestantism.

Denmark

There are around 8,000 Christians who have converted from a Muslim background in the country, most of them belonging to some form of Protestantism.

France

Protestants have increased as a percentage of total population from 1% in 1987 to 3% in 2009. 
Reports form Le Monde estimated that 15,000 Muslims convert every year to Christianity.
Some scholars and media reports indicate that there been increasing numbers of conversions to Christianity among the Maghrebis in France.

Georgia

More than 20,000 Muslims have converted to Christianity in Georgia (Abkhazia).

Germany

Reports estimated that thousands of Muslims convert every year to Christianity in Germany and vice versa.
Some scholars and media reports indicate that there been increasing numbers of conversions to Christianity among Kurds and Turks in Germany. According to scholars Felix Wilfred from the University of Madras and Chris Hann from the University of Cambridge and Max Planck Institute for Social Anthropology, since the fall of communism, the number of Muslim converts to Christianity in Kyrgyzstan has been increased.

Kosovo

Reports estimated that hundreds of Muslims convert every year to Christianity in Kosovo.

Norway

It is estimated that Orthodoxy is the fastest-growing religious faith in Norway, due to immigration from other countries, with a growth rate from 2000 to 2009 at 231.1%.

Netherlands

Reports estimated that 4,500 Muslims have converted to Christianity in the Netherlands.
In recent years a number of Dutch Muslims have converted to Christianity.

Russia

According to Roman Silantyev the executive secretary of the Inter-religious Council in Russia, about 2 million Muslims in Russia have converted to Christianity between during the last fifteen years while only 2,500 Russians converted to Islam.
According to a 2012 study, 17% of Jews in Russia identify themselves as Christians.

Sweden

In recent years a number of Swedish Muslims have converted from Islam to the Church of Sweden, most noticeably by Iranians, but also by Arabs and Pakistanis.

United Kingdom

A 2015 study estimated some 25,000 believers in Christ from a Muslim background, most of whom belong to an evangelical or Pentecostal community.
In recent years a number of Muslims have converted to Christianity in the United Kingdom.

Oceania

Australia
A 2015 study estimates some 20,000 Muslim converted to Christianity in Australia, most of them belonging to some form of Protestantism.

See also
Muslim population growth
Growth of religion
Decline of Christianity in the Western world
Christian views on contraception
Christian mission
Christianity by country
Christian emigration

References

Religious demographics
Conversion to Christianity